The Yandruwandha, alternatively known as Jandruwanta, are an Aboriginal Australian people living in the Lakes area of South Australia, south of Cooper Creek and west of the Wangkumara people.

Language

Yandruwandha is a generic term referring to a number of dialects: Yawarrawarrka, Nhirppi, Matja, Parlpamardramardra, Ngananhina, Ngapardajdhirri and Ngurawola. It belongs to the Karna group of Karnic languages The best known version is that recorded by Gavan Breen from informants in Innamincka.

Country
The Yandruwandha ranged over an estimated  of their tribal lands, which extended, according to Norman Tindale, from an area south of Cooper Creek, namely from Innamincka to Carraweena. This area also included Strzelecki Creek.

History
The Yandruwandha played a significant role in key moments of the Burke and Wills expedition. Oral lore conserved among them, according to a descendant, Aaron Paterson, has it that William John Wills, who recorded some of their words, made a good impression on the elders, who provided him with shelter in a walpa shared with an as yet uninitiated youth. While Burke and Wills died, the only man to survive, John King, did so because he found sanctuary with the Yandruwandha, among whom he was eventually found by Edwin Welch, a surveyor with Alfred William Howitt, who had been dispatched to find the missing explorers.

Many Yandruwandha people fell victims to the 1919 flu pandemic.

Customs
They practised male circumcision.

Native title

The Yandruwandha Yawarrawarrka filed a petition to have their land rights recognised in 1988.

Notable people
 Murtee Johnny (born c.1888; died Adelaide 1979) was the last member of the Yandruwanda of the Strzelecki Track, many of whom died in the flu pandemic that spread through the area in 1919. He was an accomplished stockman, working on the Mount Hopeless in the Flinders Ranges.

Alternative names
 Yandruwunta, Yandruwonta, Yantruwanta, Jendruwonta, Yandra Wandra.
 Yandrawontha, Yanderawantha, Yantowannta, Jandruwalda.
 Yanduwulda.
 Endawarra.
 Innamouka (loose transcription of the toponym Innamincka).

Notes and references

Notes

References

Aboriginal peoples of South Australia